Plausible Worlds: Possibility and Understanding in History and the Social Sciences is a 1991 book by Geoffrey Hawthorn, professor of sociology at the University of Cambridge. The book is credited with legitimizing the academic field of counterfactual history.

The book explores three points of divergence: the Black Death, the Korean War, and the influence of Duccio.

References

1991 non-fiction books
Cambridge University Press books
Historiography